Joop Westerweel (25 January 1899, Zutphen – 11 August 1944, Vught) was a schoolteacher, a non-conformist socialist and a Christian anarchist who became a Dutch World War II resistance leader, the head of the Westerweel Group.

Westerweel, along with Joachim Simon and other Jewish colleagues, helped save around 200 to 300 Jews by organizing an escape route, smuggling Jews through Belgium, France and on into neutral Switzerland and Spain. He was arrested on 10 March 1944, after leading a group of Jewish children to safety in Spain, whilst on his way back to the Netherlands at the Dutch/Belgian border. He was executed at Herzogenbusch concentration camp in August 1944.

References

Further reading

External links
Teachers Who Rescued Jews During the Holocaust. Yad Vashem
ONA SIMAITE, JOOP WESTERWEEL, IRENA SENDLEROWA. USHMM

1889 births
1944 deaths
People from Zutphen
Dutch people who died in Nazi concentration camps
Dutch resistance members
Dutch Righteous Among the Nations
Christian anarchists
Dutch anarchists
Dutch Christians
Anarcho-pacifists
Dutch people of World War II
Dutch people executed by Nazi Germany
Dutch people executed in Nazi concentration camps
Resistance members killed by Nazi Germany
Deaths by firearm in the Netherlands

Executed anarchists